The Georgia–Vanderbilt football rivalry is an American college football rivalry between the Georgia Bulldogs and Vanderbilt Commodores. Both universities are founding members of the Southeastern Conference (SEC), and currently members of the SEC's Eastern Division with a total of 81 meetings. This rivalry is both Georgia and Vanderbilt's fourth longest football rivalry. Georgia leads the series 60–20–2.

History
When the rivalry first started, Georgia only won two games by less than four points until the 12th match-up between the two teams. Georgia and Vanderbilt have played annually since 1968.

Both Georgia and Vanderbilt have shut out the other nine times. Georgia has won 19 of the last 22 games with the three losses in 2006, 2013, and 2016 by four points or less.

Notable games

1895: Vandy wins on a fumble
Georgia's Pomeroy fumbled and Vanderbilt's Elliott recovered the fumble and scored a touchdown. Georgia protested that Pomeroy was down, and coach Pop Warner  took his team from the field in protest.

1898: Georgia's first win

Prior to the game, the bets were 2 to 1 that Georgia would not score. In front of 2,000 fans at Piedmont Park in Atlanta, the Bulldogs beat the Commodores for the first ever time, 4 to 0. The score came on a run by Georgia back F. K. McCutcheon. At one point Vanderbilt disputed a John Edgerton fumble, and threatened to leave the field until Georgia's captain Walden said he would withdraw his men from the game if the decision were reversed. Georgia quarterback Kid Huff saved a touchdown when he tackled and forced a fumble from the big Wallace Crutchfield of Vanderbilt. The punting of Georgia fullback A. Clarence Jones featured throughout.

1921: Onside Kick from Scrimmage ties SIAA Championship
The Georgia Bulldogs won the SIAA championship in the prior year of 1920. The toughest Southern opponent left for either school, both with undefeated conference records, the Georgia-Vanderbilt game would decide the SIAA title. Georgia was the favorite to win this first meeting of the two schools since 1912, in part because the Bulldogs may have outplayed Harvard and defeated Auburn earlier in 1921. Georgia had the greatest line in the South, featuring four All-Southern linemen by the names of Puss Whelchel, Bum Day, Owen Reynolds, and Artie Pew. Not one team all year scored on Georgia through its line. Vanderbilt at this point was 6-1 against Georgia all time, the score all time was 184 to 4 in the Commodores' favor.

The first score came after a punt from the Commodores was returned by Georgia some 15 yards to around Vanderbilt's 30-yard line. The Bulldogs would complete an 18-yard pass from Hartley to halfback Jim Tom Reynolds, to Vanderbilt's 12-yard line.  Three punches at the line were stopped for short gains.  Hartley gained five yards and Vanderbilt was penalized for offsides.  Three line bucks netted three yards. Jim Reynolds, gaining a yard or so, went over for the touchdown with a counter on the following series. It was such a close call that it brought forth considerable argument.  Pew kicked goal.  The half ended with Georgia gaining 113 yards on offense to Vanderbilt's 9.

Soon after the start of the fourth quarter, Jess Neely intercepted a pass, weaving for a return of 25 yards to Georgia's 40-yard line before being brought down by Jim Reynolds. Two long pass attempts failed, and Thomas Ryan lined up to punt.  Rupert Smith snuck in behind Ryan, and rushed to recover the 25-yard onside kick, jumping up to get the ball off the bounce among a hoard of Bulldogs, after they had let it bounce, including the outstretched arms of the Bulldogs' Hartley, and raced for a 15-yard touchdown.  Rupert added his own extra point and the game ended as a tie, 7-7.  Georgia would go on to beat both Alabama and Clemson handily in the following weeks, while the next week Vanderbilt handled Sewanee in the mud, giving both Vanderbilt and Georgia an equal right to the claim of a 1921 SIAA title. A freshman Lynn Bomar's play at the linebacker position was especially noted, "Georgia would have trampled Vanderbilt to atoms but for Lynn Bomar," observed Nashville Tennessean sportswriter Blinkey Horn. It was said he stopped five Georgia touchdowns that day.  One source credits this as the first successful onside kick in the history of football.

1923: "Dixie's top team" licked by Commodores
On November 17, the Vanderbilt Commodores beat the Georgia Bulldogs at Dudley Field by a lopsided score of 35 to 7.  Fred Russell would say this was when "the Gold and Black hit the season's peak." Morgan Blake, sportswriter in the Atlanta Journal, wrote "No southern team has given the Georgia Bulldogs such a licking in a decade." Georgia was labeled "Dixie's top team;" its only loss coming against traditional powerhouse Yale.  Georgia's defense had previously shut out all its Southern Conference opponents, with no southern team crossing the Bulldogs' 20 or 25 yard line.  Vanderbilt halfback Gil Reese would star in this game, including two punt returns for touchdowns and two more touchdowns on the ground. Reese ran for over 200 yards for the second week in a row, with 232 yards on his five largest plays and over 300 total yards. Former Vanderbilt coach Wallace Wade, who was at the game scouting Georgia, said the Commodores that day were "the smartest I ever saw."

1924: Lynn Bomar injured

1924 brought the first victory for Georgia over Vanderbilt in twenty-seven "long years," having failed to win the last seven matches. The Commodores did well in the first quarter, but never threatened again after that. Georgia had 12 first downs to Vandy's 7, and the Bulldogs gained 284 yards to the Commodores' 128. The furthest the Commodores penetrated was to Georgia's 31-yard line. Thrice the Bulldogs got to within Vanderbilt's 10-yard line, but all three times the Vanderbilt defense stiffened and prevented a score. Bulldog quarterback "Scrappy" Moore made the 32-yard drop-kick which broke the scoreless tie in the fourth quarter. It was the last field goal kicked by a Bulldog until seventeen years later when Frank Sinkwich did so against Florida with a broken jaw in 1941.

1923 consensus All-American Lynn Bomar suffered an injury this day which would tragically end his career with Vanderbilt football. A kick to the chin from a cleat gave him a severe brain hemorrhage, leaving him with half of his body paralyzed for two days. It was figured he would never play football again. "Not a player on the team could talk of Bomar's injury without tears coming to his eyes." The next year, he would defy the odds and play professional football in the inaugural season for the New York Giants, leaving after 1926 from a different injury.

Game results 
Series record sources: College Football Data Warehouse.

See also 
 List of NCAA college football rivalry games

References

College football rivalries in the United States
Georgia Bulldogs football
Vanderbilt Commodores football